Gary Lord (6 July 1966) is an English former professional rugby league footballer who played in the 1980s, 1990s and 2000s.

Playing career

International honours
Gary Lord represented Great Britain Under-21s against France during 1988.

Challenge Cup Final appearances
Gary Lord played  in Castleford's 15-14 victory over Hull Kingston Rovers in the 1985–86 Challenge Cup Final during the 1985–86 season at Wembley Stadium, London on Saturday 3 May 1986, in front of a crowd of 82,134.

County Cup Final appearances
Gary Lord played as Substitute/Interchange, replacing Gary Hyde, in Castleford's 18-22 defeat by Hull Kingston Rovers in the 1985–86 Yorkshire County Cup Final during the 1985–86 season at Headingley Rugby Stadium, Leeds on Sunday 27 October 1985, and played as Substitute/Interchange, replacing Gary Hyde, in the 31-24 victory over Hull F.C. in the 1986–87 Yorkshire County Cup Final during the 1986–87 season at Headingley Rugby Stadium, Leeds on Saturday 11 October 1986.

Club career
Gary Lord played for the Oldham Bears in 1996's Super League I, and 1997's Super League II, he made his début for Wakefield Trinity during the 1998 season, he made his début for Featherstone Rovers on Sunday 18 February 2001, and he retired from rugby league at the end of the 2001 season.

Genealogical information
Gary Lord is the older brother of the rugby league footballer; Paul Lord.

References

External links
Stanley Rangers ARLFC - Roll of Honour
(archived by web.archive.org) Statistics at orl-heritagetrust.org.uk
Gary Lord Memory Box Search at archive.castigersheritage.com

1966 births
Living people
Batley Bulldogs players
Castleford Tigers players
English rugby league players
Featherstone Rovers players
Great Britain under-21 national rugby league team players
Halifax R.L.F.C. players
Leeds Rhinos players
Oldham R.L.F.C. players
Rugby league fullbacks
Rugby league props
Rugby league players from Wakefield
Wakefield Trinity players